St. Paul Preparatory School, formerly known as Nacel International School, is a private college school in Saint Paul, Minnesota, United States. It is also part of the Nacel International School System. Founded in 2003 by US-based student exchange organization Nacel Open Door, it recruits students from more than 50 countries worldwide. All international students are placed in host families, where they will for five to ten month periods while school is in session.

The enrollment at St. Paul Preparatory School (SPP) resides from more than 35 countries.

Host families from the metropolitan Twin Cities provide housing for the international students who attend SPP. These host families provide shelter, food and transportation support the study habits of the students and offer an understanding of the American way of life.  Students are provided an unlimited metro/bus pass to commute to and from school and visit local attractions such as Mall of America.

In 2014 St. Paul Preparatory School founded three diploma programs in STEM, Visual Arts and International Business.

Visual Arts Program diploma includes a rigorous product oriented portfolio that students develop for public presentation and sale. Students produce artistic creations derived from current inspirational motivation for competition, public display and commercial marketing.

International Business Program diploma provides the skills and knowledge necessary to understand, develop and discuss economic concepts from a micro and macro level. In depth finance concepts of managing and operating a business, as well as hands-on learning through internship based opportunities provide an exciting and interesting first hand view of the capitalist system.
An additional fourth diploma program was added in 2015. Global Leadership combines the communication skills needed for oral argument, speech communications, and problem-solving skills to emphasize leadership and issue-oriented critical thinking.

SPP is organized around the diploma programs that provide a focus for the education of all students. Many students attend the school for one year and not able to participate in the diploma programs due to graduation requirements.

Branch Campuses
After opening St. Paul Preparatory School in 2003, Nacel International School System opened up other campuses around the world for schools modeled after its St. Paul Preparatory school.

Its branch schools are located in China (Saint Paul American School), South Korea (Saint Paul International School), Philippines, Vietnam, Turkey and France(Notre-Dame International High School). A sister school is located in Poland.

References

http://www.stpaulprep.org/academics/curriculum/global-leadership-diploma.html

External links
 St. Paul Preparatory School home page

Notre-Dame International High School

Educational institutions established in 2003
Preparatory schools in Minnesota
Private high schools in Minnesota
Schools in Rice County, Minnesota
2003 establishments in Minnesota